Pyaar Ka Rishta is a 1973 Indian Bollywood film directed by Sultan Ahmed. It stars Vinod Khanna, Shatrughan Sinha and Mumtaz in pivotal roles.

Cast
 Vinod Khanna as Anil
 Sameer Khan as Raju
 Mumtaz as Madhu
 Shatrughan Sinha as Dharamdas (Munimji)
 Balraj Sahni as Ashok
 Nirupa Roy as Radha
 Johnny Walker as Lachho
 Mallika as Rani
 Jayshree T. as Flory
 Randhir as Bhagwandas (Dharamdas' Father)
 Chaman Puri as Bihari 
 Nadira as Kamla

Soundtrack
This movie probably marked the first occasion when lyricist Shakeel Badayuni wrote songs for a film which had music composed by Shankar Jaikishan. Indeevar was the other lyricist of the film.

References

External links

1970s Hindi-language films
1973 films
Films scored by Shankar–Jaikishan